Cyclic alcohol dehydrogenase (quinone) (cyclic alcohol dehydrogenase, MCAD) is an enzyme with systematic name cyclic alcohol:quinone oxidoreductase. This enzyme catalyses the following chemical reaction

 cyclic alcohol + quinone  cyclic ketone + quinol

This enzyme oxidizes a wide variety of cyclic alcohols.

References

External links 
 

EC 1.1.5